Sushmita Mangsatabam is an Indian actress and singer who predominantly appears in Manipuri films. She completed her schooling from North Point Higher Secondary School. She is well known for her titular role in the movie Thabaton.

Career
She started singing at the age of thirteen, when she was in VIII standard. She is the only person in her family to take up singing and acting as profession. Before coming into films, she began shaping her career in singing. Noklunu Minokto Atoppa Kanada, Ningjaba Mana Nungshiba Mana, Leiraroidara Khallui Taibangsida, Ningthou Machasu Kallakte are some of her famous songs. Later, she started acting with the strong support from her mother. Her first film is Chahi Taramari. But she is better known and became popular with Thaba’s role in Bijgupta Laishram’s 2013 hit Thabaton. After this, she has done a number of films. Among her popular films were Lumfoo Tomba, Amukta Ani, Chow Chow Momo na haobara Shingju Bora na oinambara, Haidokpa Yade, Thabaton 2, Angangba Mayek (Pizza 2).

Accolades
She won the Best Singer - Female Award at the 7th Sahitya Seva Samiti (SSS) MANIFA Awards 2018, for her song Thabum Kaya Yamlakley from the film Khutsha Ani.

Selected filmography

References

External links
 

Indian film actresses
Living people
21st-century Indian actresses
Meitei people
People from Imphal
Actresses from Manipur
Actresses in Meitei cinema
1994 births